Austrogomphus guerini, also known as Austrogomphus (Austrogomphus) guerini, is a species of dragonfly of the family Gomphidae, 
commonly known as the yellow-striped hunter. 
It inhabits streams, rivers and lakes in eastern New South Wales, Victoria and Tasmania, Australia.

Austrogomphus guerini is a tiny to medium-sized, black and yellow dragonfly.

Gallery

See also
 List of Odonata species of Australia

References

Gomphidae
Odonata of Australia
Insects of Australia
Endemic fauna of Australia
Taxa named by Jules Pierre Rambur
Insects described in 1842